NS13, NS-13, NS 13, NS.13, or, variation, may refer to:

Places
 Yishun MRT station (station code: NS13), Yishun, Singapore
 Tokiwadai Station (Osaka) station code: NS13; Toyono, Toyono District, Osaka Prefecture, Japan
 Uchijuku Station (station code: NS13), Ina, Saitama, Japan
 Marowijne District (FIPS region code NS13), Suriname
 Cole Harbour-Portland Valley (constituency N.S. 13), Nova Scotia, Canada

Other uses
 Blue Origin NS-13, a 2020 October 13 Blue Origin suborbital spaceflight mission for the New Shepard
 RAF N.S. 13, a British NS class airship

See also

 NS (disambiguation)
 13 (disambiguation)